Forest Forge is a British touring theatre companies based in the New Forest, England. Founded in 1981, the company is known for touring to rural and village communities.

The company was shortlisted for The Stage Award for Special Achievement in Regional Theatre in 2005.

Notes

External links
 Forest Forge Theatre Company

Theatre companies in the United Kingdom
Touring theatre